The High Commission of Ghana in London is the diplomatic mission of Ghana in the United Kingdom.

The High Commission operates two separate offices: at 13 Belgrave Square, London, SW1X 8PN, and at Cromwell House, 104 Highgate Hill, London N6 5HE, as well as an Honorary Consulate in 17 Bellevue Road, Ayr KA7 2SA Glasgow, Scotland, and a Consulate at 1 Marine Terrace, Dun Laoghaire, Dublin A96 KD86, Ireland.

The Passports, Immigration, Recruitment, Education, Trade & Investment, Police Liaison and International Maritime Organization Sections are all located in the building at 104 Highgate Hill, Highgate.

The building at 13 Belgrave Square is also known as Halkin House, and is the former town residence of the Earls Beauchamp, of Madresfield Court, near Malvern, Worcestershire.

The exterior of the building was filmed as the residence of the character Anna Kalman, played by Ingrid Bergman in the 1958 film, Indiscreet.

List of High Commissioners

Gallery

Notes

References

External links 
 Official site

Ghana
London
Ghana–United Kingdom relations
Buildings and structures in the City of Westminster
Belgravia